Caryotropha is a genus of parasitic alveolates belonging to the phylum Apicomplexa. This genus was created in 1902 by Siedelecki.

Taxonomy

Currently, there is only one species recognised in this genus.

Life cycle

This species infects the gastrointestinal tract of polychaete worms. It is not known if it has any other host.

The parasite infects the cells of the gut wall. The oocysts have a thin membrane-like wall. Each sporocyst gives rise to 12 sporozoites

Host records

Eupolymnia nebulosa. This worm of the family Terebellidae was previously known as Polymnia nebulosa but this is now regarded as a junior synonym.

References

Apicomplexa genera
Monotypic SAR supergroup genera
Conoidasida